San Juan de Guadalupe   is one of the 39 municipalities of Durango, in north-western Mexico. The municipal seat lies at San Juan de Guadalupe. The municipality covers an area of 2343.1 km².

As of 2010, the municipality had a total population of 5,947, up from 5,858 as of 2005. 

As of 2010, the town of San Juan de Guadalupe had a population of 1,712. Other than the town of San Juan de Guadalupe, the municipality had 70 localities, none of which had a population over 1,000.

References

Municipalities of Durango